The 21st Writers Guild of America Awards honored the best film writers and television writers of 1968. Winners were announced in 1969.

Winners and Nominees

Film 
Winners are listed first highlighted in boldface.

Television

Special Awards

References

External links 

 WGA.org

1968
W
Writers Guild of America Awards
Writers Guild of America Awards
Writers Guild of America Awards